Donald Lindley Harvey (July 29, 1920 – November 26, 2008) was an American professional basketball player. He played in the National Basketball League in one game for the Sheboygan Red Skins during the 1945–46 season.

While attending the University of Missouri he competed for the football, basketball, and tennis teams. He then served in the Army and worked on the Manhattan Project prior to becoming a professional basketball player. His post-playing careers included running a book store, being a restaurateur, and cattle ranching.

References

1920 births
2008 deaths
United States Army personnel of World War II
American men's basketball players
Basketball players from Missouri
College men's tennis players in the United States
Forwards (basketball)
Guards (basketball)
Military personnel from Missouri
Missouri Tigers football players
Missouri Tigers men's basketball players
Sheboygan Red Skins players
Sportspeople from Jefferson City, Missouri
Manhattan Project people